Events during the year 1106 in Italy.

Deaths
 John of Lodi
 Richard II of Capua

Births
 Pope Celestine III

Sources
William of Apulia, The Deeds of Robert Guiscard Books One (pdf)
Norwich, John Julius. The Normans in the South 1016-1130. Longmans: London, 1967.
 Clarke, Peter D., The interdict in the thirteenth century: a question of collective guilt, Oxford University Press, 2007.
 Gregorovius, Ferdinand,  History of the City of Rome in the Middle Ages  Volume IV, part 2 (translated from the 4th German edition by A. Hamilton) (London: George Bell 1896), pp. 625–638.
 Moore, John Clare, Pope Innocent III (1160/61–1216): to root up and to plant, BRILL, 2003.
 Mann, Horace K., The Lives of the Popes in the Middle Ages  Volume X (London: Kegan Paul 1914), pp. 383–441.
 Sikes, Thomas Burr, History of the Christian Church, from the first to the fifteenth century, Eliott Stock, 1885.
 The New Cambridge Medieval History, Vol.1, Ed. David Luscombe, Jonathan Riley-Smith, Cambridge University Press, 2004.
 Urban, William, The Teutonic Knights, Greenhill Books, 2003.
 Pope Celestine III (1191-1198): Diplomat and Pastor, ed. Damian J. Smith, John Doran, Ashgate Publishing, 2008.

Years of the 12th century in Italy
Italy
Italy